Roberto Jefferson Monteiro Francisco (born 14 June 1953) is a Brazilian politician.

Personal life and education
He was born on 14 June 1953, in Petrópolis, in the state of Rio de Janeiro. He is the son of Neusa Dalva Monteiro Francisco and Roberto Francisco. Roberto Jefferson is married to Ana Lúcia Novaes.

He finished his high school studies at Werneck School in Petrópolis, and received a law degree in 1979 from the Estácio de Sá University in Rio de Janeiro.

Various parties
His political career began officially in 1971, when he joined the MDB (known as PMDB since 1979) party. Jefferson remained in MDB until 1979, when he went to the Progressive Party (PP). He left the PP in 1980 and he joined the Brazilian Labour Party (PTB), which his grandfather helped to form in 1945.

Career with the PTB
Jefferson and his party were one of the key supporters of the right-wing Fernando Collor de Mello government, and a key defender in Congress during the influence peddling scandal which led to Collor's impeachment.

In 1993, he was cited in a congressional report which investigated bribery in the congressional budgeting committee as an individual who should be "investigated further". Ultimately his financial assets were deemed compatible with his declared income, though undeclared assets were found.

In 1999, he became leader of the PTB party in the Brazilian Chamber of Deputies. He continued as their leader until 2002. In February 2003, PTB elected him as its National President.

Corruption scandal and other controversies
In 2005, Jefferson became involved in a corruption scandal related to the Correios, the Brazilian postal administration. Facing a congressional inquiry related to his actions, Jefferson retaliated by exposing a cash-for-votes scheme, where he claimed congressmen were paid monthly sums to in exchange for votes supporting president Luiz Inácio Lula da Silva, in what became known as the Mensalão scandal. The scandal included dozens of parliamentarians of the government's coalition and two government ministers, among others, resulting in the indictment of forty people by the Supreme Federal Tribunal, for their alleged role in one of the country's biggest corruption scandals in recent years.

He was expelled from Congress on 14 September 2005, stemming from his actions in the Correios scandal. The expulsion barred him from being elected to any public office until 2015. In 2016 he was elected as leader of the PTB.

In March 2021, Jefferson posted a post on Instagram accusing Jews of sacrificing children, which drew massive criticism from Jewish organisations and led to the removal of the post. The Brazilian Israelite Confederation confirmed it was preparing to file charges against Jefferson.

On 13 August 2021, Jefferson was arrested on allegations of attacking democracy. Since 24 January 2022 Roberto Jefferson is under house arrest. On 23 October, Jefferson threw grenades and exchanged gunfire against agents of the Federal Police of Brazil coming to take him to prison after his house arrest was revoked after he insulted and threatened Supreme Federal Court minister Cármen Lúcia. Two officers were wounded in the incident.

References

External links
 Brazilian Chamber of Deputies

1953 births
Living people
People from Petrópolis
Brazilian whistleblowers
Brazilian Democratic Movement politicians
Progressistas politicians
Brazilian Labour Party (current) politicians
Members of the Chamber of Deputies (Brazil) from Rio de Janeiro (state)
Brazilian politicians convicted of corruption
Far-right politics in Brazil
Antisemitism in Brazil